Les chevaliers du ciel may refer to:

 The Aeronauts (TV series), a 1967–70 French TV series
 Sky Fighters, a 2005 French film